The Commander-in-Chief of the Russian Ground Forces (Russian: Главнокомандующие Сухопутными войсками России) is the chief commanding authority of the Russian Ground Forces. He is appointed by the President of Russia. The position dates to the period of the Russian Empire. The current Commander-in-Chief of the Russian Ground Forces is Army General Oleg Salyukov.

List of Commanders
† denotes people who died in office.

Red Army (1918–1946)
Commander-in-Chief

Chief of Staff

Chief of the General Staff

Soviet Ground Forces (1946–1992)
Commander-in-Chief

|-style="text-align:center;"
! colspan=7|Position of commander of ground forces did not exist from 1950–55

|-style="text-align:center;"
! colspan=7|Position of commander of ground forces did not exist from 1964–67

Russian Ground Forces (1992–present)
Commander-in-Chief

Chief of the Main Directorate 

Commander-in-Chief

Notes

References

Further reading
 V.I. Feskov, K.A. Kalashnikov, V.I. Golikov, The Soviet Army in the Years of the Cold War 1945–91, Tomsk University Publishing House, Tomsk, 2004 (for Soviet era list of CGSs).

External links
Official Russian Ministry of Defense website

Russia
Military of Russia
Military of the Soviet Union